Particle Mesh (PM) is a computational method for determining the forces in a system of particles. These particles could be atoms, stars, or fluid components and so the method is applicable to many fields, including molecular dynamics and astrophysics. The basic principle is that a system of particles is converted into a grid (or "mesh") of density values. The potential is then solved for this density grid, and forces are applied to each particle based on what cell it is in, and where in the cell it lies.

Various methods for converting a system of particles into a grid of densities exist. One method is that each particle simply gives its mass to the closest point in the mesh. Another method is the Cloud-in-Cell (CIC) method, where the particles are modelled as constant density cubes, and one particle can contribute mass to several cells.

Once the density distribution is found, the potential energy of each point in the mesh can be determined from the differential form of Gauss's law, which—after identifying the electric field  as the negative gradient of the electric potential —gives rise to a Poisson equation that is easily solved after applying the Fourier transform. Thus it is faster to do a PM calculation than to simply add up all the interactions on a particle due to all other particles for two reasons: firstly, there are usually fewer grid points than particles, so the number of interactions to calculate is smaller, and secondly the grid technique permits the use of Fourier transform techniques to evaluate the potential, and these can be very fast.

PM is considered an obsolete method as it does not model close interaction between particles well. It has been supplanted by the Particle-Particle Particle-Mesh method, which uses a straight particle-particle sum between nearby particles in addition to the PM calculation.

See also 
 P3M
 Particle mesh method
 Particle mesh Ewald method
 Madelung constant
 Poisson summation formula
 Paul Peter Ewald

Computational physics